is a 2017 role-playing video game developed by Nihon Falcom. The game is a part of the Trails series, itself a part of the larger The Legend of Heroes series, and serves as a direct sequel to The Legend of Heroes: Trails of Cold Steel II. 

Trails of Cold Steel III was released for the PlayStation 4 in Japan in September 2017 and worldwide in October 2019. Ports for Nintendo Switch, Windows, and Amazon Luna were released in 2020, with a port for Google Stadia following in April 2021. A direct sequel, The Legend of Heroes: Trails of Cold Steel IV, was released in 2018.

Gameplay
The gameplay of Trails of Cold Steel III is similar to the previous two Trails of Cold Steel games, being a traditional Japanese role-playing video game with turn-based battles. An emphasis was made on speeding up battles, including making transitions into battle scenes more seamless, and being able to map out more battle commands to specific buttons rather than various menus, though battles are still primarily menu-based. The game contains a new system called "Brave Order" which lets players expend a new resource built up during battle called "Brave Points "to get special effects such as buffs or heals. The new "Break" system was also added, which adds a "Break Gauge" bar to enemies. Attacking an enemy depletes its break gauge bar, and when fully depleted the enemy is weakened for one turn.

Plot
The game is a direct sequel to the prior two Trails of Cold Steel games, picking up one year after the events of Trails of Cold Steel II and several months after the Northern War between the Imperial army of Erebonia and the Northern Jaegers of North Ambria, which resulted in the annexation of North Ambria. The story is centered around Rean Schwarzer, now an instructor at Thors Military Academy's Branch Campus, as well as the students of the new Class VII and the rest of his classmates from the prior two entries, exploring subjects such as the mysterious circumstances of Rean's adoption by the Schwarzer family, and what his classmates have been up to since the events of the prior games.

The new Class VII consists of Juna Crawford (an exchange student from Crossbell), Kurt Vander (a member of Vander family formerly guarding the Royal family), Altina Orion (a member of the Intelligence Division and younger sister of Millium Orion), later joined by Ash Carbide from Raquel (whom later revealed to be an orphan of Hamel), and Musse Egret (a noble young lady who is actually the heir of house Cayenne).

While teaching his students, Rean is ordered by the Imperial government to resolve numerous conflicts arising all across Erebonia (mainly caused by Ouroboros, who are trying to 'retake the Phantasmal Blaze Plan', stolen from them by Chancellor Osborne in the previous game's finale) as part of the campus's field exercises, assisted by his former classmates of the old Class VII, on their missions, they learned that Rutger Claussell the Jaeger King and Fie's foster father who was believed to be dead, and Arianrhod the Steel Maiden, an anguis of Ouroboros who is actually Lianne Sandlot, an Erebonian historical figure, are actually alive and are the Awakeners of two of the Divine Knights, Zector and Argreion respectively. They also learn more about the origins of the Divine Knights, that they are the fragments of the Great One, a being created when the Sept-Terrions of Fire and Earth fused into one after an intense battle between the two. The Kin of Fire and Kin of Earth worked together to contain the unstable Great One, giving birth to the seven Divine Knights, but they were unable to contain its curse, which influenced Erebonia for many centuries, making the people of the empire to become greedy and violent and leading to tragedies such as the Attack of the Dark Dragon, the Dark Ages, the War of the Lions, the Hamel tragedy, the Hundred Days War with Liberl, the annexation of Crossbell and the Northern War. The groups later changed their names; the Kin of Fire becoming the Witches of the Hexen Clan (with Emma being one of them), and the Kin of Earth becoming the Gnomes, and the latter eventually cutting ties with the former.

Rean also learns of his origins. During his time as a brigadier general in the army, Osborne rose up against the officers who were setting up the Hamel tragedy to start a war with Liberl. In response they set his house ablaze, killed his wife and mortally wounded his son. Osborne gave his heart to Rean to save him and later left him to the Schwarzer's care.

During a party in the Imperial palace, Ash Carbide, who is being manipulated by the curse, assassinates the emperor. This leads Rean and both generations of Class VII to realize that Ouroboros, the Gnomes, and Chancellor Osborne are plotting to unleash the curse of the Great One and start the Great Twilight, an event that heralds the return of the Great One and the end of the world. The members of Class VII resolve to stop them, but during the battle with Osborne's forces, Millium sacrifices her life to protect Rean and her sister Altina. Seeing Millium die causes Rean to lose control of his Spirit Unification power, fly into a rage, and slay the "Nameless One", a creature that contained the power of the Great One's curse. The death of the Nameless One releases the curse across Erebonia, beginning the Great Twilight, and the end of the world. Afterwards, all of the present Awakeners, including Osborne himself, summon their Divine knights and restrain the Ashen Knight.

Development and release
Intentions to create a third Trails of Cold Steel game were announced in December 2015. Initial planning began in early 2016, though the development team was divided on which platforms the game should release for. On one hand, the PlayStation Vita was preferred, due to its larger installed base in Japan, and prior entries in the series being released there. However, the team also wanted to consider using the much more powerful PlayStation 4, which would greatly help with the game's scope. Full-scale development began around mid-2016. Like the previous Trails of Cold Steel entries, it was developed using the PhyreEngine game engine. The game was officially revealed in December 2016. Unlike previous two entries, no Vita or PlayStation 3 versions were developed. It was mentioned in the shareholder's meeting that a deciding factor in developing the game for the PS4 was to help ensure higher international sales for the game as the PS4 had a much larger userbase in most countries outside of Japan at the time. This premise was reiterated by Falcom president Toshihiro Kondo:
 

The Japanese release was initially scheduled for Q3 2017 for the PlayStation 4. It was released in Japan for the PlayStation 4 on September 28. Localization into English and French was handled by NIS America rather than Xseed Games, who localized the first two Trails of Cold Steel games. The announcement that NIS America was taking over caused some concern among fans, due to the issues with the initial localization of Ys VIII: Lacrimosa of Dana. This concern was settled after confirmation that key localization staffs of the first two Cold Steel games were involved. Initially set for a September 2019 release for PS4 in North America and Europe, it was later delayed to October 22. A Nintendo Switch port by Engine Software was released in Japan on March 19, 2020, in North America and Europe on June 30, and in Oceania on July 7. A Windows port by Engine Software and PH3 Games was released worldwide on March 23 the same year. A version for Amazon Luna was released on October 20, 2022. A Stadia version was released on April 1, 2021.

Reception 

After the positive reception of the first two Trails of Cold Steel games, journalists were generally enthusiastic for the prospect of a third entry, though many lamented the lack of a Vita version.

The Legend of Heroes: Trails of Cold Steel III received "generally favorable" reviews according to review aggregator Metacritic. Reviewing the North American release, Nintendo Life called it an "excellent addition to the series", although they said it had slow pacing at times. NintendoWire praised the "naturally brilliant" soundtrack, but did say it wasn't the easiest game for those unfamiliar with the storylines in prior games. Frontline Gaming Japan praised the "strong narrative and exhaustive worldbuilding", as well as a "fun battle system" and payoff for long-term fans. They criticized the dated graphics and thought previous soundtracks in the series were stronger.

Sales
Trails of Cold Steel III debuted as the best-selling game in its week of release in Japan, selling 87,261 copies. This was a significant drop from the 151,781 units Cold Steel II had sold in its first week. Media Create attributed this decline to the lack of a PlayStation Vita version. Despite this, Dengeki sales reports still estimated that approximately 80% of the game's physical stock was sold at launch, and Falcom announced that the game had the highest digital game sales in the series, as of October 2017.

Notes

References

External links
 
 

2017 video games
Japanese role-playing video games
Nihon Falcom games
Nintendo Switch games
Nippon Ichi Software games
PhyreEngine games
PlayStation 4 games
Politics in fiction
Role-playing video games
Single-player video games
Stadia games
The Legend of Heroes
Trails (series)
Video game sequels
Video games about mecha
Video games developed in Japan
War video games
Windows games
Engine Software games